George Timothy Clooney (born May 6, 1961) is an American actor and filmmaker. He is the recipient of numerous accolades, including a British Academy Film Award, four Golden Globe Awards, and two Academy Awards; one for his acting and the other as a producer. 
He has been honored with the Cecil B. DeMille Award in 2015, the Honorary César in 2017, AFI Life Achievement Award in 2018, and the Kennedy Center Honors in 2022.

Clooney started his career in television, gaining wide recognition in his role as Dr. Doug Ross on the NBC medical drama ER from 1994 to 1999, for which he received two Primetime Emmy Award nominations. He expanded to leading roles in films, with his breakthrough role in From Dusk till Dawn (1996). followed by superhero film Batman & Robin (1997), Steven Soderbergh's Out of Sight (1998), David O. Russell's Three Kings, and the Coen brothers' O Brother, Where Art Thou? (2000). Greater stardom came from his starring role in Soderbergh's Oceans film series from 2001 to 2007. 

Clooney made his directorial debut with the spy drama Confessions of a Dangerous Mind (2002), and has since directed the historical drama Good Night, and Good Luck (2005), the political drama The Ides of March (2011), the war film The Monuments Men (2014), and the science fiction film The Midnight Sky (2020). Clooney won the Academy Award for Best Supporting Actor for the thriller Syriana (2005), and earned Best Actor nominations for the legal thriller Michael Clayton (2007), and the comedy-dramas Up in the Air (2009) and The Descendants (2011). He received the Academy Award for Best Picture for co-producing the political thriller Argo (2012). He has also starred in Burn After Reading (2008), The American (2010), Gravity (2013), Hail, Caesar! (2016), and Ticket to Paradise (2022).

As of 2022, Clooney is one of three people to have been nominated for Academy Awards in six different categories, a position shared with Walt Disney. Clooney was included on Time annual Time 100 list, which identifies the most influential people in the world, every year from 2006 to 2009. He is also noted for his political and economic activism, and has served as one of the United Nations Messengers of Peace since 2008. Clooney is also a member of the Council on Foreign Relations. He is married to human rights lawyer Amal Clooney. Outside of acting, Clooney is known for cofounding Casamigos tequila, which was one of the best-selling spirits of 2022.

Early life
Clooney was born on May 6, 1961, in Lexington, Kentucky. His mother, Nina Bruce (née Warren), was a beauty queen and city councilwoman. His father, Nick Clooney, is a former anchorman and television host, including five years on the AMC network. Clooney is of Irish, German, and English ancestry. His maternal great-great-great-great-grandmother, Mary Ann Sparrow, was the half-sister of Nancy Lincoln, mother of President Abraham Lincoln, making Clooney and Lincoln half-first cousins five times removed. Clooney has an older sister named Adelia (known as Ada). Cabaret singer and actress Rosemary Clooney was an aunt. Through Rosemary, his cousins include actors Miguel Ferrer, Rafael Ferrer, and Gabriel Ferrer, who is married to singer Debby Boone.

Clooney was raised a strict Roman Catholic but said in 1998 that he did not know if he believed "in Heaven or even God." He has said, "Yes, we were Catholic, big-time, whole family, whole group." He began his education at the Blessed Sacrament School in Fort Mitchell, Kentucky. He attended St. Michael's School in Worthington, Ohio; then Western Row Elementary School (a public school) in Mason, Ohio, from 1968 to 1974; and St. Susanna School in Mason, where he served as an altar boy. The Clooneys moved back to Kentucky when George was midway through the seventh grade. In middle school, Clooney developed Bell's palsy, a medical condition that partially paralyzes the face. The malady went away within a year. In an interview with Larry King, he stated that "yes, it goes away. It takes about nine months to go away. It was the first year of high school, which was a bad time for having half your face paralyzed." He also described one positive outcome of the condition: "It's probably a great thing that it happened to me because it forced me to engage in a series of making fun of myself. And I think that's an important part of being famous. The practical jokes have to be aimed at you."

After his parents moved to Augusta, Kentucky, Clooney attended Augusta High School. He has stated that he earned all As and a B in school, and played baseball and basketball. He tried out to play professional baseball with the Cincinnati Reds in 1977, but he did not pass the first round of player cuts and was not offered a contract. He attended Northern Kentucky University from 1979 to 1981, majoring in broadcast journalism, and very briefly attended the University of Cincinnati, but did not graduate from either. He earned money selling women's shoes, insurance door to door, stocking shelves, working in construction, and cutting tobacco.

Career

Early work (1978–1993)

Clooney's first role was as an extra in the television mini-series Centennial in 1978, which was based on the novel of the same name by James A. Michener and was partly filmed in Clooney's hometown of Augusta, Kentucky. Clooney's first major role came in 1984 in the short-lived CBS sitcom E/R (not to be confused with ER, the long-running medical drama). He played a handyman on the series The Facts of Life and appeared as Bobby Hopkins, a detective, on an episode of The Golden Girls. His first prominent role was a semi-regular supporting role in the sitcom Roseanne, playing Roseanne Barr's supervisor Booker Brooks, followed by the role of a construction worker on Baby Talk, a co-starring role on the CBS drama Bodies of Evidence as Detective Ryan Walker, and then a year-long turn as Det. James Falconer on Sisters. In 1988, Clooney played one of the lead roles in the comedy-horror film Return of the Killer Tomatoes. In 1990, he starred in the short-lived ABC police drama Sunset Beat. During this period, Clooney was a student at the Beverly Hills Playhouse acting school for five years.

Breakthrough and stardom (1994–1999)

Clooney rose to fame when he played Dr. Doug Ross, alongside Anthony Edwards, Julianna Margulies, and Noah Wyle, on the hit NBC medical drama ER from 1994 to 1999. After leaving the series in 1999, he made a cameo appearance in the 6th season and returned for a guest spot in the show's final season. For his work on the series, Clooney received two Primetime Emmy Award nominations for Outstanding Lead Actor in a Drama Series in 1995 and 1996. He also earned three Golden Globe Award nominations for Best Actor – Television Series Drama in 1995, 1996, and 1997 (losing to co-star Anthony Edwards).

Clooney began appearing in films while working on ER. His first major Hollywood role was in the horror comedy-crime thriller From Dusk till Dawn, directed by Robert Rodriguez and co-starring Harvey Keitel. He followed its success with the romantic comedy One Fine Day with Michelle Pfeiffer, and the action-thriller The Peacemaker with Nicole Kidman. Clooney was then cast as Batman in Joel Schumacher's Batman & Robin, which was a modest box office performer, but a critical failure (with Clooney himself calling the film "a waste of money"). In 1998, he co-starred in the crime-comedy Out of Sight opposite Jennifer Lopez, marking the first of his many collaborations with director Steven Soderbergh. He also starred in Three Kings during the last weeks of his contract with ER.

Established leading man (2000–2004)

After leaving ER, Clooney starred in commercially successful films including Wolfgang Petersen's disaster film The Perfect Storm (2000) which was a box office success. The same year he starred in the Coen brothers adventure comedy O Brother, Where Art Thou? (2000) alongside John Turturro, Tim Blake Nelson, and John Goodman. The film, a modern satire, is loosely based on Homer's epic Greek poem the Odyssey and the Preston Sturges 1941 classic film Sullivan's Travels. This film is set in 1937 rural Mississippi during the Great Depression. He plays escaped convict Ulysses Everett McGill. He received a Golden Globe Award for Best Actor – Motion Picture Musical or Comedy nomination for his performance. Variety film critic Todd McCarthy compared Clooney to Clark Gable writing, "Not for the first time recalling Clark Gable in his looks and line delivery, Clooney clearly delights in embellishing Everett’s vanity and in delivering the Coens’ carefully calibrated, high-toned dialogue".

The following year In 2001, Clooney reunited with Soderbergh for the heist comedy Ocean's Eleven, a remake of the 1960s Rat Pack film of the same name, with Clooney playing Danny Ocean, originally portrayed by Frank Sinatra. The film starred Clooney, Brad Pitt, Julia Roberts, Matt Damon, and Andy Garcia. The film cemented Clooney as a leading film star. It is Clooney's most successful film with him in the lead role, earning $451 million worldwide (he appeared, but did not star, in Gravity, which has a $723 million worldwide box office). Ocean's Eleven inspired two sequels starring Clooney, Ocean's Twelve in 2004 and Ocean's Thirteen in 2007. In 2001, Clooney and Soderbergh co-founded Section Eight Productions, for which Grant Heslov was president of television.

The following year he would work with Soderbergh yet again in the science fiction drama Solaris (2002) an adaptation of the acclaimed 1972 film directed by Andrei Tarkovsky. Famed critic Roger Ebert praised the film and Clooney writing, "Clooney has successfully survived being named People magazine's sexiest man alive by deliberately choosing projects that ignore that image. His alliance with Soderbergh, both as an actor and co-producer, shows a taste for challenge." That same year Clooney made his directorial debut in the 2002 film Confessions of a Dangerous Mind, based on the autobiography of TV producer Chuck Barris. The film premiered out of competition at the Cannes Film Festival to critical acclaim. Though the film did not do well at the box office, critics stated that Clooney's directing showed promise.

In 2003, Clooney reunited with the Coen brothers in the romantic comedy Intolerable Cruelty opposite Catherine Zeta-Jones. Elvis Mitchell of The New York Times praised their chemistry and the casting of Clooney in the role writing, "the good work comes from George Clooney, who happens to have the Art Deco profile fit for a 1930's comedy. He scores with his willingness to mock his above-average charisma level and the chiseled chin, cover-guy good looks".

Directorial debut and acclaim (2005–2013) 

In 2005, Clooney starred in Syriana, which was based loosely on former Central Intelligence Agency agent Robert Baer's memoirs of his service in the Middle East. Clooney suffered an accident on the set of Syriana, which caused a brain injury with complications from a punctured dura. The same year he directed, produced, and starred in Good Night, and Good Luck, a film about 1950s television journalist Edward R. Murrow's famous war of words with Senator Joseph McCarthy. At the 2006 Academy Awards, Clooney was nominated for Best Director and Best Original Screenplay for Good Night, and Good Luck, as well as Best Supporting Actor for Syriana. He won the Oscar for his role in Syriana.

Clooney next appeared in The Good German (2006), a film noir directed by Soderbergh that is set in post-World War II Germany. In August 2006, Clooney and Heslov started the production company Smokehouse Pictures. In October 2006, Clooney received the American Cinematheque Award, which honors someone in the entertainment industry who has made "a significant contribution to the art of motion pictures". On January 22, 2008, Clooney was nominated for an Academy Award for Best Actor for Michael Clayton (2007) losing to Daniel Day-Lewis who won for Paul Thomas Anderson's drama There Will Be Blood (2007).

Later that year, he directed his third film, Leatherheads, in which he also starred. On April 4, 2008, Variety reported that Clooney had quietly resigned from the Writers Guild of America over a dispute concerning Leatherheads. Clooney, who is the director, producer and star of the film, claimed that he had contributed in writing "all but two scenes" of it, and requested a writing credit alongside Duncan Brantley and Rick Reilly, who had worked on the screenplay for 17 years. Clooney lost an arbitration vote 2–1, and withdrew from the union over the decision. He became a "financial core status" non-member, meaning he no longer has voting rights, and cannot run for office or attend membership meetings, according to the Writers Guild of America's constitution.

In 2009, he starred in the war comedy The Men Who Stare at Goats alongside Ewan McGregor, Jeff Bridges and Kevin Spacey. The film was directed by Heslov and released in November 2009. The film premiered at the Venice International Film Festival to positive reviews. Also in November 2009, he voiced the title character opposite Meryl Streep as Mrs. Fox in Wes Anderson's animated feature Fantastic Mr. Fox. The same year, Clooney starred in the Jason Reitman directed comedy-drama Up in the Air, which was initially given limited release, and then wide-released on December 25, 2009. Stephen Farber of The Hollywood Reporter praised Clooney's performance writing, "Boasting one of George Clooney’s strongest performances, the film seems like a surefire awards contender". For his performance in the film he was nominated for a Golden Globe, a Screen Actors Guild Award, BAFTA, and an Academy Award. The following year Clooney produced and starred in the dark crime drama The American (2010), based on the novel A Very Private Gentleman by Martin Booth and directed by Anton Corbijn.

, Clooney is represented by Bryan Lourd, co-chairman of Creative Artists Agency (CAA). In 2011 Clooney starred in The Descendants as a husband whose wife has an accident that leaves her in a coma. He earned critical praise for his work, and won the Broadcast Film Critics Association Award for Best Actor and the Golden Globe Award for Best Actor – Motion Picture Drama. Also, he was nominated for the Screen Actors Guild for Best Actor, the BAFTA Award for Best Actor, and the Academy Award for Best Actor. He was nominated for the Academy Award for Best Adapted Screenplay for the political drama The Ides of March.
In 2013, Clooney won the Golden Globe Award for Best Motion Picture – Drama, the BAFTA Award for Best Picture and the Academy Award for Best Picture for producing Argo. The following year Clooney co-starred with Sandra Bullock in Gravity (2013), a space thriller directed by Alfonso Cuarón.

In 2013, Clooney co-founded Casamigos Tequila with Rande Gerber and Michael Meldman. It was sold to Diageo for $700 million in June 2017, with an additional $300 million possible depending on the company's performance over the next ten years. According to Forbes annual ranking, he was the world's highest-paid actor for 2017–2018, earning $239 million between June 1, 2017, and June 1, 2018.

Career slump and resurgence (2014–present) 
In 2014, Clooney co-wrote, directed and starred in The Monuments Men, an adaptation of The Monuments Men: Allied Heroes, Nazi Thieves and the Greatest Treasure Hunt in History by Robert M. Edsel. The film starred an ensemble cast of A-list stars including Matt Damon, Cate Blanchett, Bill Murray, John Goodman, and Bob Balaban as well as European stars Hugh Bonneville, and Jean Dujardin. The film was a critical misfire and a box office failure. Many historians were critical of the film for its historical inaccuracies. The Guardian film critic Andrew Pulver, panned the film writing, that the film was "filled with unearned patriotic sentiment, sketchy to the point of inanity, and interrupted every few minutes with neurotic self-justification". That same year Clooney produced August: Osage County (2013), an adaptation of the play of the same name. The film stars Meryl Streep and Julia Roberts. 

His next film was Tomorrowland (2015), a science fiction adventure film in which he played Frank Walker, an inventor. Later in the year, he was featured as himself in the Netflix Christmas musical comedy A Very Murray Christmas, starring Bill Murray. The following year he starred in 
Hail, Caesar!, a comedy from the Coen brothers set in the Hollywood film industry in the 1950s, which premiered in February 2016. Clooney portrayed Baird Whitlock, a Robert Taylor-type film star who is kidnapped during the production of a film. Josh Brolin co-starred as fixer Eddie Mannix. Clooney reunited with Julia Roberts for the Jodie Foster-directed thriller Money Monster (2016), playing the host of a television show that investigates conspiracies on commerce and Wall Street, who is taken hostage by a bankrupt viewer given a bad tip.
In October 2017, his directorial project Suburbicon a 1950s-set crime comedy was released. It stars Matt Damon, Julianne Moore, and Oscar Isaac, from a script written by the Coen brothers in the 1980s, that they had originally intended to direct themselves. He received the 2018 AFI Life Achievement Award on June 7, 2018. The award was presented to him by Shirley MacLaine, and was honored by Julianna Margulies, Cate Blanchett, Bill Murray, Anna Kendrick, Jimmy Kimmel, Jennifer Aniston, Courteney Cox and his wife Amal Clooney. 

In 2019, Clooney returned to television, starring, directing, and producing the Hulu historical miniseries Catch-22 based upon the novel of the same name by Joseph Heller. Clooney was initially cast in a main role in the series; however, he opted to take a smaller supporting role instead. The series premiered on May 31, 2019, to critical acclaim.

After a four year absence from acting in film Clooney starred in the science fiction film,The Midnight Sky a film he also directed, and produced based upon the Lily Brooks-Dalton debut novel, Good Morning, Midnight, for Netflix. He also directs The Tender Bar adaptation for Amazon Studios with Ben Affleck in the lead. It will have a limited release in Los Angeles and New York theatres on December 17, 2021, followed by a nationwide premiere on December 22, 2021. The coming-of-age film will be streaming on Amazon Prime Video from January 7, 2022.

In February 2021, The Hollywood Reporter reported that Clooney's Smokehouse Pictures would be teaming with Sports Illustrated Studios and 101 Studios to produce a docuseries about the Ohio State University abuse scandal, and that the series would be based on an October 2020 Sports Illustrated article by Jon Wertheim.

In September 2021, Clooney reteamed with Brad Pitt for an untitled thriller film written and directed by Jon Watts.

In 2022, he reunited with Julia Roberts for a romantic comedy film Ticket to Paradise directed by Ol Parker. It was initially set to release in theatres on September 30, 2022, but was pushed by a month to October 21, 2022.

Activism and public advocacy

Political views
Clooney supported both of Barack Obama's 2008 and 2012 presidential campaigns. Clooney endorsed Hillary Clinton for the 2016 presidential election. Clooney endorsed Joe Biden for the 2020 presidential election, and he hosted a virtual fundraiser for Biden together with Obama on July 28, 2020.

He has also made humorous statements against Republican Party figures. In 2006, Clooney sarcastically thanked Jack Abramoff at the 63rd Golden Globe Awards before concluding with "Who would name their kid 'Jack' with 'off' at the end? No wonder the guy's screwed up". Clooney has also described Republican donor Steve Wynn as an "asshole" and a "jackass", after the two had a heated disagreement over the Affordable Care Act.

Humanitarian work

Clooney is involved with Not On Our Watch Project, an organization that focuses global attention and resources to stop and prevent mass atrocities, along with Brad Pitt, Matt Damon, Don Cheadle, David Pressman, and Jerry Weintraub. In February 2009, he visited Goz Beida, Chad, with New York Times columnist Nicholas D. Kristof. In January 2010, he organized the telethon Hope for Haiti Now, which collected donations for the 2010 Haiti earthquake victims.

In March 2012, Clooney starred with Martin Sheen and Brad Pitt in a performance of Dustin Lance Black's play '8'—a staged reenactment of the federal trial that overturned California's Prop 8 ban on same-sex marriage—as attorney David Boies. The production was held at the Wilshire Ebell Theatre and broadcast on YouTube to raise money for the American Foundation for Equal Rights. In September 2012, Clooney offered to take an auction winner out to lunch to benefit the Gay, Lesbian and Straight Education Network (GLSEN). GLSEN works to create a safe space in schools for children who are or may be perceived to be gay, lesbian, bisexual or transgender.

On August 7, 2020, George and Amal Clooney donated $100,000 to three Lebanese charities after the capital, Beirut, was left devastated by a deadly explosion. They donated money to the Lebanese Red Cross, Impact Lebanon, and Baytna Baytak. The blast claimed the lives of at least 145 people and injured more than 5,000.

Darfur

Clooney has advocated a resolution of the Darfur conflict. He spoke at a 2006 Save Darfur rally in Washington, D.C. In April 2006, he spent ten days in Chad and Sudan with his father to make the TV special "A Journey to Darfur" reflecting the situation of Darfur's refugees, and advocated for action. The documentary was broadcast on American cable TV as well as in the UK and France. In 2008, it was released on DVD with the sale proceeds being donated to the International Rescue Committee. In September of the same year, he spoke to the UN Security Council with Nobel Prize-winner Elie Wiesel to ask the UN to find a solution to the conflict and to help the people of Darfur. In December, he visited China and Egypt with Don Cheadle and two Olympic winners to ask both governments to pressure Sudan's government.

On March 25, 2007, he sent an open letter to German Chancellor Angela Merkel, calling on the European Union to take "decisive action" in the region given the failure of Sudan President Omar al-Bashir to respond to UN resolutions. He narrated and was co-executive producer of the 2007 documentary Sand and Sorrow. Clooney also appeared in the documentary film Darfur Now, a call-to-action film released in November 2007 for people all over the world to help stop the Darfur crisis. In December 2007, Clooney and fellow actor Don Cheadle received the Summit Peace Award from the Nobel Peace Prize Laureates in Rome. In his acceptance speech, Clooney said that "Don and I ... stand here before you as failures. The simple truth is that when it comes to the atrocities in Darfur ... those people are not better off now than they were years ago." On January 18, 2008, the United Nations announced Clooney's appointment as a UN messenger of peace, effective January 31.

Clooney conceived of and, with John Prendergast – human rights activist, co-founder of the Enough Project, and Strategic Advisor for Not on Our Watch Project – initiated the Satellite Sentinel Project (SSP), after an October 2010 trip to South Sudan. SSP aims to monitor armed activity for signs of renewed civil war between Sudan and South Sudan, and to detect and deter mass atrocities along the border regions there.

Clooney and Prendergast co-wrote a Washington Post op-ed piece in May 2011, titled "Dancing with a dictator in Sudan", arguing that:

On March 16, 2012, Clooney was arrested outside the Sudanese Embassy for civil disobedience. He intended to be arrested when he planned the protest. Several other prominent participants were also arrested, including Martin Luther King III. Clooney has been described as one of the most strident critics of Omar al-Bashir.

Armenian genocide
Clooney supports the recognition of the Armenian genocide. He is one of the chief associates of the 100 Lives Initiative, a project which aims to remember the lives lost during the event. As part of the initiative, Clooney launched the Aurora Prize, which awards to those who risk their lives to prevent genocides and atrocities. Clooney had also urged various American government officials to support the United States' recognition of the Armenian Genocide. Clooney visited Armenia to commemorate the 101st anniversary of the event in April 2016.

Syria
In May 2015, Clooney told the BBC that the Syrian conflict was too complicated politically to get involved in and he wanted to focus on helping the refugees. In March 2016, he and his wife, Amal Clooney, met with Syrian refugees living in Berlin to mark the fifth anniversary of the conflict, before meeting with German Chancellor Angela Merkel to thank her for Germany's open-door policy.

Gun control
In 2018, following the Stoneman Douglas High School shooting, the Clooneys pledged $500,000 to the March for Our Lives and said they would be in attendance.

LGBT rights 
Clooney is a supporter of gay rights. On March 28, 2019, Clooney wrote an open letter calling for the boycott of the Sultan of Brunei's hotels over a new law that came into force on April 3, 2019, that punishes homosexual sex and adultery with death by stoning. Clooney lists nine hotels including The Dorchester, 45 Park Lane, Coworth Park, The Beverly Hills Hotel, Hotel Bel-Air, Le Meurice, Hotel Plaza Athenee, Hotel Eden and Hotel Principe di Savoia and asks readers to consider how "we are putting money directly into the pockets of men who choose to stone and whip to death their own citizens for being gay or accused of adultery."

Personal life

Relationships

Clooney dated actress Kelly Preston (1987–1989). During this relationship, he purchased a Vietnamese Pot-bellied pig named Max as a gift for Preston, but when their relationship ended, Clooney kept the pig for an additional 18 years until Max died in 2006. He has jokingly referred to Max as the longest relationship he had ever had.

Clooney was married to actress Talia Balsam from 1989 to 1993. He also had a relationship with actress Ginger Lynn Allen. In 1995, Clooney dated Cameron Diaz and Frances Fisher. Clooney dated French reality TV personality Céline Balitran (1996–1999). In 2000 he was linked to Charlize Theron and Lucy Liu. After meeting British model Lisa Snowdon in 2000, he had a five-year on-again, off-again relationship with her. Clooney dated Renée Zellweger (2001), Jennifer Siebel Newsom (2002), Krista Allen (2002–2008), and Linda Thompson (2006). In June 2007, he started dating reality personality Sarah Larson, but the couple broke up in May 2008. In July 2009, Clooney was in a relationship with Italian actress Elisabetta Canalis until they split in June 2011. In July 2011, Clooney started dating former WWE personnel Stacy Keibler, and they ended their relationship in July 2013.

Clooney became engaged to British-Lebanese human rights lawyer Amal Alamuddin on April 28, 2014. He subsequently said they forged a strong bond because of their interest in campaigning work, and particularly over the issue of the Elgin Marbles, when she was acting for the government of Greece in support of their return from the British Museum and he, while promoting his film The Monuments Men, had argued for this and been criticised by the Mayor of London, Boris Johnson.

In July 2014, Clooney publicly mocked the British tabloid newspaper Daily Mail after it claimed his fiancée's mother opposes their marriage on religious grounds. When the tabloid apologized for its false story, Clooney refused to accept the apology. He called the paper "the worst kind of tabloid. One that makes up its facts to the detriment of its readers." On August 7, 2014, Clooney and Alamuddin obtained marriage licenses at the Royal Borough of Kensington and Chelsea of the United Kingdom. Alamuddin and Clooney were officially married on September 27, 2014, at Ca' Farsetti. They were married by Clooney's friend Walter Veltroni, the former mayor of Rome.

In 2015, Clooney and Alamuddin adopted a rescue dog, a Bassett Hound named Millie, from the San Gabriel Valley Humane Society.

On February 9, 2017, it was reported by the CBS talk show, The Talk, that Amal was pregnant, and that they were expecting twins. On June 6, 2017, Amal gave birth to a daughter, Ella, and a son, Alexander. In 2020, Clooney revealed to Jimmy Kimmel and Graham Norton in their respective talk shows that the twins can speak Italian fluently, despite both Clooney and Alamuddin not speaking the language.

Real estate
Clooney has property in Los Angeles. He purchased the  house in 1995 through his George Guilfoyle Trust. His home in Italy is in the village of Laglio, on Lake Como, near the former residence of Italian author Ada Negri. Clooney also owns a home in Los Cabos, Mexico, that is next door to the home of Cindy Crawford and Rande Gerber. In 2014, Clooney and his new British wife Amal Alamuddin bought the Grade II listed Mill House on an island in the River Thames at Sonning Eye in Oxfordshire, England at a cost of around £10 million. In May 2021, The Economic Times reported Clooney plans to buy a vineyard near the village of Brignoles, in France, which includes an 18th-century manor with its own swimming pool and a tennis court.

Motorcycle accidents
On September 21, 2007, Clooney and then-girlfriend Sarah Larson were injured in a motorcycle accident in Weehawken, New Jersey, when his motorcycle was hit by a car. The driver of the car reported that Clooney attempted to pass him on the right, while Clooney said that the driver signaled left and then decided to make an abrupt right turn and clipped his motorcycle. On October 9, 2007, more than two dozen staff at Palisades Medical Center were suspended without pay for looking at Clooney's medical records in violation of federal law.

On July 10, 2018, Clooney was hit by a car while riding a motorcycle to a film set in Sardinia. He was hospitalized with minor injuries.

Sports
Growing up around Cincinnati, Clooney is a fan of the Cincinnati Bengals and Cincinnati Reds. He tried out to be a Red in 1977. Clooney is also an association football fan and supports  club Derby County F.C.

Relationship with the media
In November 2021, Clooney wrote an op-ed to British tabloid The Daily Mail, petitioning them to stop publishing photos of his children, highlighting that his wife is an international lawyer who works "confronting and putting on trial terrorist groups" and that the tabloid was endangering their lives. In 2014, Clooney had rejected an apology from the Daily Mail for printing a false story, calling the Mail, the "worst kind of tabloid."

In the media
Clooney has appeared in commercials outside the U.S. for Fiat, Nespresso, Martini vermouth, Omega, and Warburtons. Clooney was named one of Time magazine's 100 Most Influential People in the World in 2007, 2008, and 2009. He is sometimes described as one of the most handsome men in the world. In 2005, TV Guide ranked Clooney No. 1 on its "50 Sexiest Stars of All Time" list. The cover story in a February 2008 issue of Time magazine was headlined with: "George Clooney: The last movie star".

He was parodied in the South Park episode "Smug Alert!", which criticizes his acceptance speech at the 78th Academy Awards. Clooney has also lent his voice to South Park as Sparky the Dog in "Big Gay Al's Big Gay Boat Ride" and as the emergency room doctor in South Park: Bigger, Longer & Uncut. Clooney was caricatured in the American Dad! episode "Tears of a Clooney", in which Francine Smith plans to destroy him.

Director Alexander Cartio made his debut feature film, Convincing Clooney, about a Los Angeles artist who, faced with rejection as an actor and screenwriter, concocts a master plan to get Clooney to star in his first-ever low-budget short film. The movie was released on DVD in November 2011.

Publications
 "The Key to Making Peace in Africa". Co-authored with John Prendergast. Foreign Affairs, Vol. 97, No. 2, March 14, 2018.

Awards and nominations

Throughout his career, Clooney has won two Academy Awards, one for Best Supporting Actor for his role in Syriana and one for Best Picture as one of the producers for Argo, as well as a BAFTA and a Golden Globe. For his role in The Descendants, he won a Golden Globe Award and was nominated for an Academy Award, BAFTA Award, Satellite Award, and two Screen Actors Guild Awards: Best Lead Actor and Best Cast. On January 11, 2015, Clooney was awarded the Golden Globe Cecil B. DeMille Lifetime Achievement Award.

References

External links

 
 
 
 

1961 births
20th-century American male actors
21st-century American male actors
Activists from California
Actors from Lexington, Kentucky
AFI Life Achievement Award recipients
American anti–Iraq War activists
American expatriate male actors in the United Kingdom
American expatriates in Italy
American gun control activists
American humanitarians
American male film actors
American male screenwriters
American male television actors
American people of English descent
American people of German descent
American people of Irish descent
Best Drama Actor Golden Globe (film) winners
Best Musical or Comedy Actor Golden Globe (film) winners
Best Screenplay AACTA International Award winners
Best Supporting Actor Academy Award winners
Best Supporting Actor Golden Globe (film) winners
Cecil B. DeMille Award Golden Globe winners
César Honorary Award recipients
Chevaliers of the Ordre des Arts et des Lettres
English-language film directors
European Film Awards winners (people)
Film directors from Kentucky
Filmmakers who won the Best Film BAFTA Award
Former Roman Catholics
Golden Globe Award-winning producers
American LGBT rights activists
Living people
Male actors from Kentucky
People from Augusta, Kentucky
Producers who won the Best Picture Academy Award
Screenwriters from Kentucky
United Nations Messengers of Peace